Divya Kumar may refer to:

 Divya Khosla Kumar (born 1987), Indian actress, producer and director
 Divya Kumar (singer), Indian Bollywood playback singer
 Divya Ajith Kumar, officer of the Indian Army